Boban Bogosavljevic (born 26 April 1988)was the Serbian Chess Champion. He obtained FIDE Master title in 2005. In 2008, FIDE awarded him with Chess Grandmaster title. He won the Serbian Chess Championship in 2013.

Notable Tournaments

References 

1988 births
Living people
Chess grandmasters
Serbian chess players
People from Vršac